Phanom Sarakham is a district (amphoe) in the central part of Chachoengsao province, central Thailand.

History & toponymy
Mueang Phanom Sarakham was a city of Ayutthaya Kingdom, contemporaneous with Mueang Phanat Nikhom and Sanam Chai Khet. It became Phanom Sarakham District in 1894. In 1937 the district office was moved from Ban Mueang Mai, Phanom Sarakham Subdistrict to Ban Nong Ri, Mueang Kao Subdistrict.

The original name of the district should be spelled as "Phanom Salakham" (พนมสาลคาม). The word "Sala" (शाल) is Pali means sal tree (Shorea robusta) or resin tree (Dipterocarpus alatus). Phanam San is a name that corresponds to the geography that is full of resin trees. The word "Phanam San" means "grove of resin trees".

Geography
Neighbouring districts are (from the east clockwise): Sanam Chai Khet, Plaeng Yao, Ratchasan of Chachoengsao Province; Si Mahosot and Si Maha Phot of Prachinburi province.

The important water resource is the Khlong Tha Lat.

Economy
Ko Khanun Subdistrict has become a centre for recycling potentially hazardous electronic waste (e-waste), despite a June 2018 ban on imports of foreign e-waste to Thailand. China banned the import of foreign e-waste in 2018 also. Since the e-waste ban, 28 new recycling factories, most dealing with e-waste, have started in Chachoengsao Province, where Ko Khanun is located. In 2019, 14 businesses in Chachoengsao were granted licenses to process electronic waste, six of them in Ko Khanun in Phanom Sarakham District. An official of the Basel Action Network, which campaigns against dumping waste in poor countries, said, "E-waste has to go somewhere, and the Chinese are simply moving their entire operations to Southeast Asia. The only way to make money is to get huge volume with cheap, illegal labour and pollute the hell out of the environment," he added.

Administration

Central administration 
The district is divided into eight sub-districts (tambons), which are further subdivided into 87 administrative villages (mubans).

Local administration 
There are five sub-district municipalities (thesaban tambons) in the district:
 Ban Song consisting of sub-district Ban Song.
 Tha Than consisting of sub-district Tha Than.
 Ko Khanun consisting of parts of sub-district Ko Khanun.
 Khao Hin Son consisting of parts of sub-district Khao Hin Son.
 Phanom Sarakham consisting of parts of sub-district Phanom Sarakham.

There are six sub-district administrative organizations (SAO) in the district:
 Ko Khanun consisting of parts of sub-district Ko Khanun.
 Phanom Sarakham consisting of parts of sub-district Phanom Sarakham.
 Mueang Kao consisting of sub-district Mueang Kao.
 Nong Yao consisting of sub-district Nong Yao.
 Nong Nae consisting of sub-district Nong Nae.
 Khao Hin Son consisting of parts of sub-district Khao Hin Son.

References

External links
 Phanom Sarakham district history on Chachoengsao Province website (Thai)
amphoe.com

Phanom Sarakham